Commodore Shahid Ashraf (born 1947), is a retired one-star rank admiral in the Pakistan Navy and a former spy whose role was central in a massive military scandal took place during the second administration of Prime Minister Benazir Bhutto.

He was accused to receiving monetary corruption when he led the Naval Intelligence office under the staff of Admiral Mansurul Haq, the Chief of Naval Staff from 1994 until 1997. He was subsequently court-martial but his matter was later subjected to cover-up by the Pakistani military under the Chairman Joint Chiefs of Staff General Pervez Musharraf in 1999.

Biography

Shahid Ashraf was born in 1947, and joined the Navy in 1964. He saw the military actions during the Indo-Pakistani War of 1965 and the Indo-Pakistani War of 1971.

In 1995, Captain Ashraf was appointed to the Naval Headquarters (NHQ) and was appointed as the Hydrographer of the Navy Hydrographic Department under then-Admiral Mansurul Haq, the Chief of Naval Staff.

In 1996, Captain Ashraf was promoted to one-star rank and was subsequently appointed as the Director-General of the Naval Intelligence.

During this time, Commodore Ashraf was briefed by Naval Intelligence, led by Rear-Admiral Javed Iqbal, on the Navy receiving massive illegal financial credits from the French Navy under the auspices of Admiral Mansurul Haq. Ashraf later confronted Haq, but joined the latter when Haq subsequently pressured him, according to the official inquiry of Naval Intelligence. In 1997, Ashraf handed over command of Naval Intelligence to Rear-Admiral Tanvir Ahmed and traveled to Great Britain to attend the war course at the Royal College of Defence Studies.

In 1997, Ahmed eventually exposed the military scandal after he led the arrests of Mansurul Haq and later wound up his operation when he requested the government to recall Commodore Ashraf from his overseas studies. The Navy JAG prosecution leveled charges against Ashraf of receiving ₨. 1.5 million when he faced a court-martial at Zafar Naval base in Islamabad. In 1998, Ashraf, along with Captains Liaquat Ali Malik and Z.U. Alvi, pleaded guilty of taking the bribes and was sentenced to imprisonment for nearly seven years. However, Ashraf maintained in the court-martial that he had sought permission of leading an attempt to catch the foreign agent who was giving bribe money to naval officers, but was not allowed to do so by the NHQ.

His case findings were later subjected to a military cover-up by Chairman Joint Chiefs General Pervez Musharraf in 2000 from the inquiries of the National Accountability Bureau.

In 2010, Ashraf later blamed the outcomes of the scandals on the successive government led by Prime Minister Nawaz Sharif and senior naval officers in the NHQ, but declined to comment his role in receiving ₨. 1.5 million. He claimed that the corruption charges leveled against the Bhutto-Zardari family, were politically motivated when the Sharif family was the largest beneficiary of the Agosta submarine deals.

References

External links

1947 births
Pakistan Military Academy alumni
Pakistan Navy officers
Military personnel of the Indo-Pakistani War of 1965
Pakistani military personnel of the Indo-Pakistani War of 1971
Pakistan Naval War College alumni
Pakistani oceanographers
Pakistan Navy admirals
Pakistani spies
Corruption in Pakistan
Benazir Bhutto
Pakistani white-collar criminals
Pakistani people convicted of tax crimes
People who were court-martialed
Living people